The Irishman is an Australian 1978 romantic drama film directed and written by Donald Crombie.

Production
The film is based on the 1960 book by Elizabeth O'Conner, and was written and directed by Donald Crombie for whom it was "a labour of love".

The movie was budgeted at $767,000 but went $800,000 over. It was filmed in May through to July in 1977.

Release
The film was a disappointment at the box office. Crombie later said he thought it was five to ten minutes too long, and suffered from being released soon after The Mango Tree, another coming of age period movie set in Queensland, when there was a backlash against period films.

References

External links

1978 films
Australian romantic drama films
Films based on Australian novels
Films directed by Donald Crombie
1978 romantic drama films
1970s English-language films
1970s Australian films